Georganne Deen (born 1951 in Fort Worth, Texas) is an American artist, poet and musician. She now lives and works in Joshua Tree, California.

Solo exhibitions 
 2013 Brand 10, Fort Worth, Texas,  forever eve
 2012 Webb Gallery, Waxahachie, Texas,  Song of Myself
 2011 VAN HORN, Düsseldorf, Once Upon a Stratum of Consciousness
 2009 VAN HORN, Düsseldorf, The Dramatic Upheaval & Ultimate Fall of the Status Quo
 2008 Smith-Stewart, New York, The Love That Has No Opposite
 2007 VAN HORN, Düsseldorf, The Devil's Daughter
 2004 Mixture Contemporary Art, Houston, Texas, The Heroine's Trip
 2003 Lizabeth Oliveria Gallery, San Francisco, California, Western Witch, Season of the
 2002 The MAC, Dallas, Texas, Georganne Deen: 1992–2002
 2002 Barry Whistler Gallery, Dallas, Texas,  I Gave it All Away for Love
 2002 Mixture Contemporary Art,  Houston, Texas, The New Alchemy (From Shit City)
 2001 Babilonia 1808,  Berkeley, California,  The Secret Storm
 2000 Waikato Museum of Art,  Hamilton, New Zealand, 15 Psychic Orgasms
 1999 Dunedin Public Art Gallery, Dunedin, New Zealand
 1998 Christopher Grimes Gallery, Santa Monica, California,   Un Fuc Me (and let me live again)
 1998 The Power Plant Public Art Gallery, Toronto, Ontario,  Georganne Deen
 1997 The Guggenheim Gallery at Chapman University, Los Angeles, California,  Georganne Deen
 1996 Christopher Grimes Gallery, Santa Monica, California,  The Mind Hospital
 1994 Christopher Grimes Gallery, Santa Monica, California,  The Mother Load
 1988 La Luz de Jesus Gallery, Los Angeles, California, Crying Game
 1981 Zero Zero Gallery, Los Angeles, California,  Georganne Deen

Publications 
 5000 Jahre Moderne Kunst – Painting, Smoking, Eating, Hrsg. Andreas Baur für die Galerien der Stadt Esslingen am Neckar, 96 S., farb. und s/w Abb., Texte von Andreas Baur, Andreas Baur/Marcus Weber, Andreas Seltzer, Georg Baselitz, Hansjörg Fröhlich 
 Blasted Allegories: Werke aus der Sammlung Ringier, Kunstmuseum Luzern 2008 
 Western Witch, Season of the foreword by Thurston Moore, Perceval Press 2003 
 The Godfrey Daniels School of Charm at Track 16, Smart Art Press and Western Witch 2002
 Georganne Deen 1992–2002 essay by Doug Harvey catalogue from The McKinney Avenue Contemporary, Dallas Tex. 2002
 Georganne Deen catalogue from The Power Plant, essay by Philip Monk, Toronto Ontario Canada 1998
 Georganne Deen an Exhibition of Paintings essays by Michael Duncan, Amy Gerstler Smart Art Press Santa Monica California 
 If That's All You Can Remember, poetry and paintings Studio Camuffo Venezia 1997

Sources 
 Behrens, Katja "Verspielter Exorzismus", TAZ nrw, 20. March 2007
 Wertheim, Christine "Georganne Deen: Underground Woman" X-tra Winter 2006
 Harvey, Doug "I Art the 80's" L.A. Weekly, March 2006
 Fahl, David "Text Hook" Houston Press, June 17, 2004
 Klaasmeyer, Kelly, Deen's List" Houston Press, Jan.2, 2003
 Lowry, Mark, "Artist's Work Hits Close to Home" Fort Worth Star Telegram, Mar. 13, 2002
 Mitchell, Charles Dee, "Self Examination Turns Disturbing" The Dallas Morning News Feb. 28, 2002
 Deen, Georganne, "The Girlfriend and The Devil" Grand Street #70
 Halstrup, Anjee "Georganne Deen: The Secret Storm and the Vogue Book of the Dead" ZERO magazine July 2001
 Rodriguez, Juan "Georganne Deen at Babilonia 1808" Artweek June 2001
 McEwam, Ann "15 Psychic Orgasms" Waitako Times Mar 8, 2000

References

External links 
Georganne Deen's web site
Van Horn Society's artist's biography
LA Times articles

1951 births
Living people
Fantastic art
American women artists
21st-century American women